Limosano is a comune (municipality) and Latin titular see in the Province of Campobasso in the southern Italian region Molise, located about  northwest of Campobasso.
   
Limosano borders the following municipalities: Castropignano, Fossalto, Lucito, Montagano, Petrella Tifernina, Ripalimosani, Sant'Angelo Limosano. The village is a  medieval town located on a tuff hill.

History
The town originated in the early Middle Ages around a Lombard castle.

From the mid-19th century through to the mid-20th century thousands emigrated from Limosano to Canada and the United States. A large proportion of the descendants of Limosano, once counting some 3,000 inhabitants, now live in Toronto and the St. Catharines Niagara region of Ontario, Canada.

Titular see
Limosano was established as a titular see of the Catholic Church on 5 February 2018.

Titular archbishop Henryk Jagodziński (3 May 2020 – present)

References 

 

Cities and towns in Molise